The 2009 Ukrainian Super Cup became the sixth edition of Ukrainian Super Cup, which is an annual football exhibition game contested by the winners of the previous season's Ukrainian Top League and Ukrainian Cup competitions.

The match was played on 11 July 2009 in Sumy at Yuvileiny Stadium which recently lost its main tenant FC Spartak Sumy that dissolved earlier. Dynamo were protesting to play in Sumy. On 17 June 2009 it was picked as a nominal host. On 30 June 2009 the television channel "Inter" made a press-release announcing that it signed a contract with the Ukrainian Premier League about exclusive rights on broadcasting of the event.

This year the Super Cup was contested by league winner Dynamo Kyiv and cup winner Vorskla Poltava. Dynamo won it 4–2 on penalties.

Match

Details

Post-game commentaries
The Vorskla's head coack Mykola Pavlov stated that his team lost due to mistakes of his players who in penalty shoot out did not perform well, as well as wonderful play of the Dynamo's keeper Oleksandr Shovkovskyi. Shovkovskyi deflected one of last kicks, while another a player of Vorskla sent over a goal.

Five of eight players who participated in penalty shootout were from the Balkans and only two were from Ukraine.

References

External links
 Ihor Miroshnychenko. The 2009 football. The hunting season is opened! (Футбол 2009. Сезон полювання відкрито!). Ukrayinska Pravda blogs. 16 July 2009
 Dynamo Kyiv gained the Ukrainian Super Cup («Динамо» (Київ) здобуло Суперкубок України). Radio Free Europe/Radio Liberty. 12 July 2009.

2009
2009–10 in Ukrainian football
FC Dynamo Kyiv matches
FC Vorskla Poltava matches
Sport in Sumy
Ukrainian Super Cup 2009